Larry Wade (born November 22, 1974 in Giddings, Texas) (Graduated from Elgin High School) is an American former track and field athlete who specialized in the 110 metres hurdles.  His personal best is a time of 13.01 seconds, achieved in July 1999 in Lausanne which made him the seventh fastest man in history of the event. Wade was inducted into the Texas A&M University Hall of Fame.  Wade later went on to become one of the leading strength and conditioning coaches for professional boxers such as Shawn Porter, Badou Jack, Caleb Plant, and Youtube Superstar Olajide Olatunji. Wade is a sports commentator for many networks and was given a proclamation from the City of Las Vegas for his work with Professional and Amateur Boxers naming December 15 officially Larry Wade Day in Nevada.

Career

College
He attended Texas A&M University (College Station) where he won Southwest Conference Championship in the 110 hurdles. He also received a  Bronze Medal at the 1995 Olympic Festival Championship in Colorado.  Wade was a silver medalist at the 1995 NCAA Outdoor Track and Field Championship, which was the 5th fastest time in NCAA history. In 1997 Wade won the first Track and Field Big 12 Conference Championship in the 110 Hurdles with a time of 13.38. This conference record  lasted over 10 years. In that same year he became a member of Alpha Phi Alpha fraternity at Texas A&M University ( Pi Omicron chapter ) Shortly after he went on to win 2 NCAA Titles in 1998 (55hurdles/110 hurdles) Wade was selected to be in ESPN "Faces In The Crowd" in 1998. The following year he won the Big 12 indoor Conference Championship in another conference record of 7.09, then went on to win the Indoor NCAA Championship in the 55m hurdles. Outdoors, he repeated as NCAA Champion win a win the 110 m hurdles. Wade finished his Career as a 5 Time NCAA All-American in Track and Field.

Professional
Wade turned professional in 1998, signing a professional deal with Nike. In 1999 Wade was ranked number 3 in the world by track and field news in 110 hurdles. As a 2000 Olympic Hopeful, Wade had heart surgery. In 2001 Wade receives the Bronze Medal at the Goodwill Games in the 110 hurdles. In 2001 Wade was ranked number 3 in the world in the 110 hurdles by Track and Field News.  In 2002 Wade was ranked number 3 in the world in the 110 hurdles by Track and Field News.

In 2003 Wade won a silver medal at the 2003 Pan American Games in 110 hurdles. In 2003 Wade was third nationally and placed fourth at the 2003 World Championships in Athletics in the 110 hurdles. He ranked number 6 in the world by Track and Field News for the season. Between July 2004 and July 2006, Wade was suspended for USADA Doping Violations. In 2007 Wade Returned to the track and ran a time of 13.37 that placed him in the top 10 in the United States. In 2007 Wade officially retired from Track and Field.

Coaching career
In 2006 Wade was selected to be the Head Track and Field Coach for the Kingdom of Saudi Arabia for the 2006 Asian Games. The team won eight gold medals and 2 bronze medals in athletics at the competition.

In 2007, Wade was inducted into the Texas A&M University Hall of Fame. He was the 2007 Head Coach for Track and Field Club Double Pillar LLC.

In 2008, Wade was selected as the Co-Head Coach for Pasadena City College.

In 2009, Wade became the 2009 Assistant Coach for San Diego State University which place in the top 25 at the 2009 NCAA Track and Field Outdoor Championship. This was the first time the feat had been accomplished in 25 years.

In 2010, Wade became the Head Track and Field Coach For Pasadena City College. In 2012, Wade became the new meet director for historical track and field meet, Pasadena Games.

Wade was honored as State Women's Track and Field Coach of the Year in 2013. Wade was hired as Sprints Coach at the University of Nevada, Las Vegas (UNLV).

In 2013, Shawn Porter hired Wade as speed and conditioning coach and he won the 2013 IBF Welterweight Championship.

In 2016, Coach Wade was recognized as one of the elite strength and conditioning coaches in the nation and his client Shawn Porter was in the fight of the year against WBA welterweight champion Keith Thurman. WBC super middleweight Champion Badou Jack hired Wade to be the strength and conditioning coach against IBF super middleweight champion James Degale. Wade helps to train Welter Weight boxer Shawn Porter to win Boxer of the year and he also become the Number 1 WBC contender. The fight ended in a draw.

In 2017 Wade Trained WBC Super Middle Weight Champion Badou Jack to win the WBA Light Heavy Weight World Championship against Nathan Cleaverly. On November 4 of 2017 Wade wins his 4th World Championship as a strength and condition coach with Shawn Porter who wins the WBC welterweight Silver Belt.

In 2018 Wade assisted in win UNLV Track and Fields program with their first Mountain West Conference Championship in Track and Field every.

Athletes he has trained include:
Dominique Arnold American Record Holder 110 Hurdles / World Championship Medelist  
Carmelita Jeter Olympian / World Record Holder 4x100 Relay 
Candice Davis World Championship Medalist 
Hector Cotto Olympian  
Jessica Sanchez
Rodney Martin Olympian 
Leroy Dixon World Champion 4x100
Hamdan Odha Al Bishi Olympian
Hadi Soua'an Al-Somally Olympian 
Yahya Habeeb Olympian 
John Steffensen Olympian 
Shevon Stoddart Olympian
Andrea Bliss
Nelly Tchayem Olympian
Uhunoma Osazuwa Olympian
Chauncey Washington NFL
Brandon Manumaleuna NFL
Brian Price NFL
Javorius Allen NFL
Quinton Pointer NFL
Devante Davis NFL
Thomas Graham Jr NFL
Gilbert Arenas NBA
Shawn Porter Boxing
Badou Jack Boxing
Caleb Plant Boxing
Olajide Olatunji Boxing
Louis Ortiz Boxing
Rolando Romero Boxing
Robeisy Romerez Boxing
Joe Joyce Boxing
Shane Mosley Jr Boxing
Patrick Teixeira Boxing
Batry Jukenbaev Boxing
Jesus Ramos Jr Boxing

International competitions

See also 
List of doping cases in athletics

References

External links 
 

1974 births
Living people
People from Giddings, Texas
Sportspeople from Texas
American track and field coaches
American male hurdlers
African-American male track and field athletes
Pan American Games track and field athletes for the United States
Pan American Games medalists in athletics (track and field)
Athletes (track and field) at the 2003 Pan American Games
World Athletics Championships athletes for the United States
Doping cases in athletics
American sportspeople in doping cases
Pan American Games silver medalists for the United States
Sports coaches from California
Goodwill Games medalists in athletics
Competitors at the 2001 Goodwill Games
Medalists at the 2003 Pan American Games
21st-century African-American sportspeople
20th-century African-American sportspeople